Engineer Regiments were a key aspect of the Union army during the American Civil War. The duties engineer regiments during the American Civil War included destroying and building transportation networks, erecting defensive and offensive emplacements, and providing situational intelligence. Though federally organized engineer units existed, the vast majority of engineer units and regiments, were volunteers from civilian engineering fields. Within the Union army, there were 12 engineering regiments, of which, 11 regiments were volunteer regiments. Notable engineer regiments include the decorated 1st New York Volunteer Engineer Regiment and the 1st Regiment of Louisiana Engineers (an all African-American regiment).

See also 
List of New York Civil War regiments
1st Michigan Engineers and Mechanics Regiment
1st New York Volunteer Engineer Regiment

Notes

References 

Engineer units and formations of the Union Army